Northwood School is a high school in the coastal city of Durban, in KwaZulu-Natal, South Africa. Northwood was founded after two schools, Beachwood High and Northlands High combined - forming Northwood School.

Curriculum

Each learner must study English home language and either Afrikaans or Zulu first additional language, and mathematics or mathematical literacy. Northwood offers a variety of subjects, including the physical, natural and social sciences; a variety of commerce subjects (ranging from Business Studies to Accounting); Technical Drawing, Graphi Design and Tourism. All learners write internally set school papers until grade 12 in which all registered pupils sit to write their National Senior Certificate.

Facilities

Northwood's sporting facilities include rugby union, soccer and cricket fields, tennis courts, basketball courts, volleyball courts, two rock climbing walls and a number of other specialised sporting centres.

History 

Northwood traces its origins back to the founding of the co-educational Durban North High School on the site of the present Northlands Girls' High School in September 1949. It started with 12 staff members and 215 pupils under headmaster George J. Armstrong. By 1951, numbers had grown so rapidly that it was decided to build a second high school in Durban North, and split the existing school into a boys' school and a girls' school.

On 30 September 1953, the Northwood campus in Kensington Drive was opened. Northlands Boys' High School opened with 338 boys and 17 staff members, under Percy Hardaker (1953–1962) and thereafter R.C. McFarquhar (1963–1974). Numbers continued to grow, requiring the building of yet another boys' school in the area.

The new Beachwood Boys' High School opened in Gleneagles Drive in 1963 with 135 boys and 7 staff members under headmaster E.T. (Ted) Lewis. Other headmasters at Beachwood were HM Puzey, KL Tomlinson, MJ Ellis and CW Thorpe.

At the end of 1971, Lewis retired from Beachwood and was succeeded by A.J.M. Wilkinson. In 1975, he became headmaster of Northlands Boys' High. The thaw in the relationship between the two schools had begun, but rivalry continued. During 1989 it was proposed that, for economic reasons, the two boys' schools in Durban North merge to form a single school. In 1990 Beachwood and Northlands merged to form Northwood. It was possible, with an adjustment of colours, to merge the school badges and retain both mottoes. Ian Corbishley was made headmaster of the combined school until 1996, when P. Hawkey acted as headmaster until A.P. Jordan succeeded him during 1998. Upon the retirement of Jordan at the end of 2012, P.L. McAvoy took over the post in 2013.

Notable Old Boys 

Gus Attridge
Keshav Maharaj
Andy Marinos
Shaun Pollock
Hugh Reece-Edwards
Chris Smith
Robin Smith
John Steenhuisen
Neil Tovey
Brian Whitfield

References

External links 

Boarding schools in South Africa
Schools in KwaZulu-Natal
Educational institutions established in 1990
1990 establishments in South Africa